Akçakoca is a town in Düzce Province, in the Black Sea region of Turkey, located about 200 km east of Istanbul. It is the seat of Akçakoca District. Its population is 27,878 (2022). The town was named after a Turkish chieftain of the 14th century CE who captured the area for the Ottoman Empire, and sports a statue in his honor. The town features a modern mosque of unusual design. Tourist attractions include beaches and a small ruined Genoese castle. It is the regional center of hazelnut cultivation.

Name 
Akçakoca was known as Diapolis or Dia in the classical period. However, after the Turkish conquest, Akçaşehir became more common, before being changed to Akçakoca in 1934.

Population 
Although Akçakoca's estimated population is about 30,000; it increases during summer months, due to tourism activities and cottage owners. Due to war, specifically the one between the Ottomans and Russia in 1877–1878, a wide range of people, most of whom had roots in the Pontic region (Lazes, Georgians, and Abkhazians), emigrated from their native lands to settle in Akçakoca.

History

Latin-Nicea Empires Period and Genoese 
During the Fourth Crusade, European armies conquered Constantinople in 1204, founding the Latin Empire for a short period. Because of this situation, the Genoese established commercial bases on the Western Black Sea coasts for their interests, which included a Genoese castle in Akçakoca. This castle helped to protect trade routes in the area and was used for commercial activities itself. When the Nicea Empire reconquered Constaninople in 1261, Akçakoca, which was under the auspices of the Nicea Empire, came under Byzantine rule again.

Turkic people seem to have been living in Akçakoca since 1243, after Mongol pressure and defeat. From Kastamonu, the Oghuz tribes of Kınık and Üçok migrated westward, some of them came to Akçakoca and settled. The Oghuz Turks then plundered Genoese trade centers and Greek villages, upon which the Genoese and Greeks complained to the Byzantine Emperor, the Byzantine Emperor responded to the complaints and brought and settled Christian Cumans, Pechenegs, Uzes from Romania Dobruja to protect the region against the Turkmens. Oguz from the Kayı tribe settled here.

The Seljuks and Ottoman 
Before the crusades, The Seljuk Sultanate of Rum controlled the region around Akçakoca.

There is no evidence that a military action was taken by the Ottomans to conquer Akçakoca from the Byzantines. According to some historians, the Turk population  submitted to Ottoman rule without military action.

In the late 19th and early 20th century, Akçakoca was part of the Kastamonu Vilayet of the Ottoman Empire.

Republic 
After the foundation of Turkish Republic, it was renamed Akçakoca. The first governor was Ali Zarifi (Okay). Due to the 1999 Düzce and Marmara earthquakes, Düzce had been declared a province by the government, and the town was included in the new province as a district.

Economy

Tourism 
After the 1950s, touristic activities in summer seasons attained an important place in Akçakoca's economy. The construction of tourism facilities and new transportation improvements further influenced tourism in the late-1970's.

Water sports 
Numerous water sports such as sailing, swimming, water skiing, sunbathing, fishing, scuba diving, are performed in Akçakoca. Sailing and diving have become more prominent in the last few years. In 2010, sailing races have been held as part of the 14th Akçakoca Festival. Furthermore, the first Marine and Sailing Club in the town was opened in town in 2012.

Heavy industry 
Akçakoca has one large factory, which produces large pipes for a variety of purposes. It has great importance both Akçakoca and Ereğli. Akçakoca also has only natural gas platform over the Black Sea. There are four platforms which three of them are small and one is big.

Fishing 
Fishing is traditional job in Akçakoca. Anchovies, nonita, bluefish, whiting, red mullet, clams, jack mackerel, sea bass, salmon, trout, and turbot are some of fish that can be found.

Government 
One governor's office and one municipality building can be found in Akçakoca. It has one state hospital, one rest home and a small tourism office for tourists.

Construction 
There is an attractive mosque what built in 2004. Akçakoca Central Mosque was built in a similar fashion to Faisal Mosque in Pakistan. The mosque was designed by Ergün Subaşı. This highly irregular mosque was placed above 160 concrete poles driven into the ground. The dome height is 31 meters and covered by 32 tons of copper plates. And the chandelier that resembles the dome in reverse weigh around 1300 kg. The rocket like minarets are at 58 meters in height.

Culture

Festivals 
There is a traditional festival every July. During the festival, scheduled buses from neighbor towns and cities, such as Ereğli, Düzce, Zonguldak, Bolu and Adapazarı carrypeople to Akçakoca.

Languages 
Some native languages are nearly forgotten, but there are some towns and people who speak Georgian, Laz and Circassian.  Native Turk people of Akçakoca are Manav Turks.

Dances and Music 
Because of the presence of many residents originally from the eastern Black Sea littoral, 'Horon', played with the Pontic lyra/kemençe are popular here.

Gallery

References

External links 

 Municipality's official website 
 Pictures of Akçakoca

Populated places in Düzce Province
Black Sea port cities and towns in Turkey
Fishing communities in Turkey
Populated coastal places in Turkey
Akçakoca District
Towns in Turkey